IIED can be an abbreviation of:

International Institute for Environment and Development
Intentional infliction of emotional distress